Sedimenticola selenatireducens is a bacterium from the genus of Sedimenticola which has been isolated from estuarine sediments from the Arthur Kill in the United States.

References

Alteromonadales
Bacteria described in 2006